Cargo is transported goods or produce.

Cargo may also refer to:

Places
 Cargo, New South Wales, in Cabonne Shire, Australia
 Cargo, Cumbria, a village near Carlisle, England
 Cargo Pond,  Alatna Valley, in the Convoy Range of Victoria Land, Antarctica

People
 Bobby Cargo (1868–1904), American baseball player
 David Cargo (1929–2013), American lawyer and politician
 Carlos González (baseball),  a baseball player nicknamed CarGo

Films 
 Cargo (1990 film), Canadian dram film
 Cargo (2006 film), a film directed by Clive Gordon
 Cargo (2009 film), a Swiss science fiction film directed by Ivan Engler
 Cargo (2013 film), an Australian short film about a zombie apocalypse
 Cargo (2017 film), an Australian feature-length remake of the 2013 film
 CarGo, a 2017 American computer animated film by The Asylum
 Cargo (2018 film), an American horror thriller film
 Cargo (2019 film), an Indian Hindi-language science fiction film

Music
 Cargo (album), 1983 album by the Australian pop rock band Men at Work
 Cargo (band), a Romanian heavy metal band
 Cargo Records (disambiguation)

Other uses
 Cargo (British homewares chain), a defunct British homewares retail chain
 Cargo, software used with the Rust programming language
 Cargo system, a social system in rural Mexico and Central America

See also

 Cargoe
 Kargo
 Kargow
 Kargów
 Cargo cult (disambiguation)